Arkansas Peace Society was a Unionist organization in the state of Arkansas during the American Civil War. 

Most Arkansans supported secession, but some, especially in the northern part of the state, remained loyal to the United States. They founded the Arkansas Peace Society in order to protect themselves from forced enlistment and impressment. The organization was destroyed by state troops, but the resistance against the Confederacy remained strong during the whole war. In spite of the state having the third smallest white population in the Confederacy, more white Arkansans enlisted in the Union Army than in any other seceded state, except Tennessee.

References

Further reading
 Worley, Ted R. (1958). "The Arkansas Peace Society of 1861: A Study in Mountain Unionism." The Journal of Southern History, Vol. 24, No. 4, pp. 445-456.

See also
Red Strings

External links
 The Arkansas Peace Society 1861
 Brother Against Brother, The Arkansas Peace Society and the Yellar Rag Boys YouTube

Arkansas in the American Civil War
Southern Unionists in the American Civil War